Elise Hambro (27 August 1881 – 30 August 1966) was a Norwegian educator. She is known for being the first female school principal in Norway, appointed head of Ulrike Pihl Girls School in Bergen from 1926. She was born in Bergen; the daughter of educator Edvard Isak Hambro and Nicoline Hambro, and was the sister of politician C. J. Hambro, president of the Parliament of Norway.

References

1881 births
1966 deaths
Schoolteachers from Bergen
Heads of schools in Norway
Norwegian people of Danish-Jewish descent
Place of birth missing